Vitrophyre is a volcanic rock with a porphyritic texture in which larger crystals (phenocrysts) are embedded in a glassy groundmass.

References

Volcanic rocks